The 2018 Michigan State Spartans football team represented Michigan State University in the 2018 NCAA Division I FBS football season. The Spartans played their home games at Spartan Stadium in East Lansing, Michigan, and competed in the East Division of the Big Ten Conference. They were led by 12th-year head coach Mark Dantonio.

The Spartans returned 19 starters from their Holiday Bowl-winning 2017 team, and began the year at 11th in the AP Poll. In the second game of the year, the team was upset on the road by unranked Arizona State. The team fell out of the top 25 after falling to Northwestern on homecoming, but bounced back with a road win against then-No. 8 Penn State. The Spartan offense struggled mightily in the second half of the season, and the team failed to score more than 7 points in losses to Michigan, Ohio State, and Nebraska. They finished the regular season in fourth in the East Division with a conference record of 5–4. Michigan State was invited to the Redbox Bowl, where they lost to Oregon by a score of 7–6, which matched their final record.

The team was characterized by a stark dichotomy in performance between offense and defense; the defense finished in the top ten nationally in six categories, while the offense finished in the bottom 20 nationally in six categories. Junior quarterback Brian Lewerke led the team in passing, finishing the year with 2,040 passing yards, 8 touchdowns and 11 interceptions. He was replaced by redshirt freshman Rocky Lombardi in several games as Lewerke struggled with injuries and poor performance. Connor Heyward, replacing the injured LJ Scott, led the team in rushing. On defense, Kenny Willekes led the Big Ten in tackles for a loss (21), and was named the conference's Defensive Lineman of the Year. Linebacker Joe Bachie was also an impact player, being named first team all-conference by the coaches.

Previous season 
The Spartans finished the 2017 season 10–3, 7–2 in Big Ten play to finish in a tie for second place in the East Division. The Spartans received an invitation to the 2017 Holiday Bowl where they defeated Washington State.

Offseason

2018 NFL Draft
MSU kept its streak of 78 years of having at least one player drafted in the NFL Draft alive when Brian Allen was drafted in the fourth round.

Additionally, one player, Chris Frey Jr., was signed by the Carolina Panthers as an undrafted free agent.

Recruiting

Preseason

Award watch lists

Schedule

Source

Personnel

Roster

Position key

Coaching staff
On January 2, 2018, Harlon Barnett was hired as defensive coordinator for Florida State, leaving the Spartans after spending the previous 14 years with head coach Mark Dantonio. On January 19, the school announced that co-defensive coordinator Mike Tressel was promoted to defensive coordinator with the departure of Barnett.

Also on January 19, former Kent State head coach Paul Haynes was hired as the secondary coach. Haynes, who was fired from Kent State after five seasons as head coach, returned to the Spartans after serving as defensive backs coach from 2003–04. On January 22, the school announced the hiring of former Kent State offensive coordinator Don Treadwell, who had coached with the Spartans on two prior occasions, as a defensive backs and special teams coach. On February 1, the school hired Chuck Bullough as defensive ends coach.

Game summaries

Utah State

The Spartans opened the 2018 season under the lights at home against Mountain West opponent Utah State.

Utah State received the opening kickoff and took little time scoring on their opening drive, taking only just over two minutes to score on a Jordan Love one-yard run. The MSU offense stalled at midfield on their first drive, but Matt Coghlin made a 49-yard field goal to put the Spartans on the board, 7–3. After a turnover on downs on the following Utah State possession, Michigan State added another field goal, bringing them within a point. The second quarter featured sloppy play from both teams. As Michigan State was driving into Utah State territory, Brian Lewerke was sacked and attempted to throw the ball away. After review, the officials determined that Lewerke had not completed a forward throwing motion, that he had fumbled the ball, and it was recovered by Utah State. However, the Aggies did not score off of the turnover. Several possessions later, the Aggies committed a turnover of their own when Jordan Love threw an interception that resulted in Michigan State points when Brian Lewerke connected with Cody White on a seven-yard pass for a touchdown. The score gave the Spartans their first lead of the game, 13–7. Utah State answered with a touchdown of their own on the following possession, retaking the lead 14–13. The Spartan offense drove deep into Utah State territory and Felton Davis scored on a 10-yard touchdown pass from Brian Lewerke with 28 seconds left in the half to give MSU a 20–14 lead at halftime.

The Spartans extended their lead after in the second half when a 17-yard Connor Heyward touchdown run increased their lead to 27-14. Late in the third quarter, Utah State added a field goal to narrow the lead to 27–17. The following Michigan State possession ended in disaster when a Brian Lewerke pass intended for Jalen Nailor was intercepted and returned for a touchdown by Gage Ferguson to bring Utah State within three, 27–24. Michigan State increase their lead with a field goal early in the fourth quarter, but Utah State retook the lead with five minutes remaining in the game on a Darwin Thompson one-yard touchdown run. Brian Lewerke led the offense down the field the following possession, completing five straight passes before Connor Heyward scored the go-ahead touchdown on an option pitch from Lewerke to give Michigan State a 36–31 lead with two minutes remaining. Lewerke then connected with Davis on the two-point conversion pass to give MSU a 38–31 lead. With less than two minutes remaining, Utah State drove the ball to the MSU 46-yard line. However, MSU linebacker Joe Bachie leapt to deflect a pass and secured the interception to seal the win for the Spartans, avoiding a major upset. Michigan State extended its home opening winning streak to 20 games with the victory.

at Arizona State

at Indiana

Central Michigan

Northwestern

at Penn State

Michigan

Purdue

at Maryland

Ohio State

at Nebraska

Rutgers

vs. Oregon (Redbox Bowl)

Rankings

Awards and honors

Players drafted into the NFL

References

Michigan State
Michigan State Spartans football seasons
Michigan State Spartans football